The 2019 Wake Forest Demon Deacons football team represented Wake Forest University during the 2019 NCAA Division I FBS football season. The team was led by sixth-year head coach Dave Clawson, and played their home games at BB&T Field in Winston-Salem, North Carolina. They competed in the Atlantic Division of the Atlantic Coast Conference.

Preseason

Preseason media poll
In the preseason ACC media poll, Wake Forest was predicted to finish in sixth in the Atlantic Division.

Schedule
Wake Forest's 2019 schedule began with four non-conference games: at home against Utah State of the Mountain West Conference, on the road against Rice of Conference USA, at home against North Carolina, and at home against Elon of the Colonial Athletic Association. The game against North Carolina, a fellow member of the Atlantic Coast Conference, was played as a non-conference game and therefore did not count in the league standings. This was done because the two rivals otherwise only play once every six years due to the current ACC divisional alignment.

In ACC play, Wake Forest played the other members of the Atlantic Division, as well as Virginia Tech and Duke from the Coastal Division.

Game summaries

Utah State

at Rice

North Carolina

Elon

at Boston College

Louisville

Florida State

NC State

at Virginia Tech

at Clemson

Duke

at Syracuse

vs Michigan State (Pinstripe Bowl)

Personnel

Coaching Staff

Roster

Rankings

Players drafted into the NFL

References

Wake Forest
Wake Forest Demon Deacons football seasons
Wake Forest Demon Deacons football